Sarpa salpa, known commonly as the dreamfish, salema, salema porgy, cow bream or goldline, is a species of sea bream, recognisable by the golden stripes that run down the length of its body, and which can cause ichthyoallyeinotoxism when eaten.
It is found in the East Atlantic, where it ranges from the Bay of Biscay to South Africa, as well as in the Mediterranean. It has occasionally been found as far north as Great Britain. Males are typically   in length, while females are usually .

Sarpa salpa became widely known for its ichthyoallyeinotoxic effects following widely publicized articles in 2006, when two men ingested it at a Mediterranean restaurant and began to experience many auditory and visual hallucinogenic effects. These hallucinations, described as frightening, were reported to have occurred two hours after the fish was ingested and had a total duration of 36 hours.

The fish, and especially its viscera, have been assessed as potentially unsafe by a study conducted on Mediterranean specimens. It is believed that the fish ingests a particular algae or phytoplankton which renders it ichthyoallyeinotoxic.

References

External links
 

Sparidae
Fish described in 1758
Taxa named by Carl Linnaeus